Herbert Oberhofer (16 November 1955 – 23 November 2012) was an Austrian international footballer.

References

1955 births
2012 deaths
Association football defenders
Austrian footballers
Austria international footballers
Austrian Football Bundesliga players
FC Admira Wacker Mödling players